Carlos Eduardo Lopes (born February 22, 1980 in Jaú), or simply Du Lopes, is a Brazilian central defender.

Career
Du Lopes made two appearances in the Campeonato Paulista, both with Guarani FC during March 2009. He also played for Oeste Futebol Clube in the 2010 Campeonato Brasileiro Série D.

Honours
Pernambuco State League: 2007

Contract
26 December 2006 to 10 December 2007

References

External links

1980 births
Living people
Brazilian footballers
Esporte Clube XV de Novembro (Jaú) players
América Futebol Clube (RN) players
América Futebol Clube (SP) players
Associação Portuguesa de Desportos players
Sport Club do Recife players
União São João Esporte Clube players
Oeste Futebol Clube players
Esporte Clube XV de Novembro (Piracicaba) players
Association football defenders
People from Jaú